Kurt Vonnegut (November 11, 1922 – April 11, 2007) was an American writer and humorist known for his satirical and darkly humorous novels. In a career spanning over 50 years, he published fourteen novels, three short-story collections, five plays, and five nonfiction works; further collections have been published after his death.

Born and raised in Indianapolis, Vonnegut attended Cornell University but withdrew in January 1943 and enlisted in the US Army. As part of his training, he studied mechanical engineering at the Carnegie Institute of Technology (now Carnegie Mellon University) and the University of Tennessee. He was then deployed to Europe to fight in World War II and was captured by the Germans during the Battle of the Bulge. He was interned in Dresden, where he survived the Allied bombing of the city in a meat locker of the slaughterhouse where he was imprisoned. After the war, he married Jane Marie Cox, with whom he had three children. He adopted his nephews after his sister died of cancer and her husband was killed in a train accident. He and his wife both attended the University of Chicago, while he worked as a night reporter for the City News Bureau.

Vonnegut published his first novel, Player Piano, in 1952. The novel was reviewed positively but was not commercially successful at the time. In the nearly 20 years that followed, he published several novels that were well regarded, two of which (The Sirens of Titan [1959] and Cat's Cradle [1963]) were nominated for the Hugo Award for best SF or fantasy novel of the year. He published a short-story collection titled Welcome to the Monkey House in 1968. His breakthrough was his commercially and critically successful sixth novel, Slaughterhouse-Five (1969). The book's anti-war sentiment resonated with its readers amidst the ongoing Vietnam War, and its reviews were generally positive. After its release, Slaughterhouse-Five went to the top of The New York Times Best Seller list, thrusting Vonnegut into fame. He was invited to give speeches, lectures, and commencement addresses around the country, and received many awards and honors.

Later in his career, Vonnegut published several autobiographical essay and short-story collections, such as Fates Worse Than Death (1991) and A Man Without a Country (2005). After his death, he was hailed as one of the most important contemporary writers and a dark humor commentator on American society. His son Mark published a compilation of his unpublished works, titled Armageddon in Retrospect, in 2008. In 2017, Seven Stories Press published Complete Stories, a collection of Vonnegut's short fiction, including five previously unpublished stories. Complete Stories was collected and introduced by Vonnegut friends and scholars Jerome Klinkowitz and Dan Wakefield. Numerous scholarly works have examined Vonnegut's writing and humor.

Biography

Family and early life 
Kurt Vonnegut Jr. was born in Indianapolis on November 11, 1922, the youngest of three children of Kurt Vonnegut Sr. and his wife Edith (née Lieber). His older siblings were Bernard (born 1914) and Alice (born 1917). He had descended from German immigrants who settled in the United States in the mid-19th century; his paternal great-grandfather, Clemens Vonnegut, settled in Indianapolis and founded the Vonnegut Hardware Company. His father and grandfather Bernard were architects; the architecture firm under Kurt Sr. designed such buildings as Das Deutsche Haus (now called "The Athenæum"), the Indiana headquarters of the Bell Telephone Company, and the Fletcher Trust Building. Vonnegut's mother was born into Indianapolis high society, as her family, the Liebers, were among the wealthiest in the city with their fortune deriving from ownership of a successful brewery.

Both of Vonnegut's parents were fluent German speakers, but the ill feeling toward Germany during and after World War I caused them to abandon German culture in order to show their American patriotism. Thus, they did not teach Vonnegut to speak German or introduce him to German literature and traditions, leaving him feeling "ignorant and rootless". Vonnegut later credited Ida Young, his family's African-American cook and housekeeper during the first decade of his life, for raising him and giving him values; he said that she "gave [him] decent moral instruction and was exceedingly nice to [him]", and "was as great an influence on [him] as anybody". He described her as "humane and wise" and added that "the compassionate, forgiving aspects of [his] beliefs" came from her.

The financial security and social prosperity that the Vonneguts had once enjoyed were destroyed in a matter of years. The Liebers' brewery was closed in 1921 after the advent of prohibition. When the Great Depression hit, few people could afford to build, causing clients at Kurt Sr.'s architectural firm to become scarce. Vonnegut's brother and sister had finished their primary and secondary educations in private schools, but Vonnegut was placed in a public school called Public School No. 43 (now the James Whitcomb Riley School). He was bothered by the Great Depression, and both his parents were affected deeply by their economic misfortune. His father withdrew from normal life and became what Vonnegut called a "dreamy artist". His mother became depressed, withdrawn, bitter, and abusive. She labored to regain the family's wealth and status, and Vonnegut said that she expressed hatred for her husband that was "as corrosive as hydrochloric acid". She unsuccessfully tried to sell short stories she had written to Collier's, The Saturday Evening Post, and other magazines.

High school and Cornell 

Vonnegut enrolled at Shortridge High School in Indianapolis in 1936. While there, he played clarinet in the school band and became a co-editor (along with Madelyn Pugh) for the Tuesday edition of the school newspaper, The Shortridge Echo. Vonnegut said that his tenure with the Echo allowed him to write for a large audience—his fellow students—rather than for a teacher, an experience, he said, was "fun and easy". "It just turned out that I could write better than a lot of other people", Vonnegut observed. "Each person has something he can do easily and can't imagine why everybody else has so much trouble doing it."

After graduating from Shortridge in 1940, Vonnegut enrolled at Cornell University in Ithaca, New York. He wanted to study the humanities or become an architect like his father, but his father and brother Bernard, an atmospheric scientist, urged him to study a "useful" discipline. As a result, Vonnegut majored in biochemistry, but he had little proficiency in the area and was indifferent towards his studies. As his father had been a member at MIT, Vonnegut was entitled to join the Delta Upsilon fraternity, and did. He overcame stiff competition for a place at the university's independent newspaper, The Cornell Daily Sun, first serving as a staff writer, then as an editor. By the end of his first year, he was writing a column titled "Innocents Abroad", which reused jokes from other publications. He later penned a piece "Well All Right" focusing on pacifism, a cause he strongly supported, arguing against US intervention in World War II.

World War II

The attack on Pearl Harbor brought the US into the war. Vonnegut was a member of Reserve Officers' Training Corps, but poor grades and a satirical article in Cornell's newspaper cost him his place there. He was placed on academic probation in May 1942 and dropped out the following January. No longer eligible for a deferment as a member of ROTC, he faced likely conscription into the United States Army. Instead of waiting to be drafted, he enlisted in the Army and in March 1943 reported to Fort Bragg, North Carolina, for basic training. Vonnegut was trained to fire and maintain howitzers and later received instruction in mechanical engineering at the Carnegie Institute of Technology and the University of Tennessee as part of the Army Specialized Training Program (ASTP).

In early 1944, the ASTP was canceled due to the Army's need for soldiers to support the D-Day invasion, and Vonnegut was ordered to an infantry battalion at Camp Atterbury, south of Indianapolis in Edinburgh, Indiana, where he trained as a scout. He lived so close to his home that he was "able to sleep in [his] own bedroom and use the family car on weekends".

On May 14, 1944, Vonnegut returned home on leave for Mother's Day weekend to discover that his mother had committed suicide the previous night by overdosing on sleeping pills. Possible factors that contributed to Edith Vonnegut's suicide include the family's loss of wealth and status, Vonnegut's forthcoming deployment overseas, and her own lack of success as a writer. She was inebriated at the time and under the influence of prescription drugs.

Three months after his mother's suicide, Vonnegut was sent to Europe as an intelligence scout with the 106th Infantry Division. In December 1944, he fought in the Battle of the Bulge, the final German offensive of the war. During the battle, the 106th Infantry Division, which had only recently reached the front and was assigned to a "quiet" sector due to its inexperience, was overrun by advancing German armored forces. Over 500 members of the division were killed, and over 6,000 were captured.

On December 22, Vonnegut was captured with about 50 other American soldiers. Vonnegut was taken by boxcar to a prison camp south of Dresden, in the German province of Saxony. During the journey, the Royal Air Force mistakenly attacked the trains carrying Vonnegut and his fellow prisoners of war, killing about 150 of them. Vonnegut was sent to Dresden, the "first fancy city [he had] ever seen". He lived in a slaughterhouse when he got to the city, and worked in a factory that made malt syrup for pregnant women. Vonnegut recalled the sirens going off whenever another city was bombed. The Germans did not expect Dresden to be bombed, Vonnegut said. "There were very few air-raid shelters in town and no war industries, just cigarette factories, hospitals, clarinet factories."

On February 13, 1945, Dresden became the target of Allied forces. In the hours and days that followed, the Allies engaged in a firebombing of the city. The offensive subsided on February 15, with about 25,000 civilians killed in the bombing. Vonnegut marveled at the level of both the destruction in Dresden and the secrecy that attended it. He had survived by taking refuge in a meat locker three stories underground. "It was cool there, with cadavers hanging all around", Vonnegut said. "When we came up the city was gone ... They burnt the whole damn town down." Vonnegut and other American prisoners were put to work immediately after the bombing, excavating bodies from the rubble. He described the activity as a "terribly elaborate Easter-egg hunt".

The American POWs were evacuated on foot to the border of Saxony and Czechoslovakia after US General George S. Patton captured Leipzig. With the captives abandoned by their guards, Vonnegut reached a prisoner-of-war repatriation camp in Le Havre, France, before the end of May 1945, with the aid of the Soviets. He returned to the United States and continued to serve in the Army, stationed at Fort Riley, Kansas, typing discharge papers for other soldiers. Soon after he was awarded a Purple Heart, about which he remarked: "I myself was awarded my country's second-lowest decoration, a Purple Heart for frost-bite." He was discharged from the US Army and returned to Indianapolis.

Marriage, University of Chicago, and early employment 
After he returned to the United States, 22-year-old Vonnegut married Jane Marie Cox, his high-school girlfriend and classmate since kindergarten, on September 1, 1945. The pair relocated to Chicago; there, Vonnegut enrolled in the University of Chicago on the G.I. Bill, as an anthropology student in an unusual five-year joint undergraduate/graduate program that conferred a master's degree. There, he studied under anthropologist Robert Redfield, his "most famous professor". He augmented his income by working as a reporter for the City News Bureau of Chicago at night. Jane accepted a scholarship from the university to study Russian literature as a graduate student. Jane dropped out of the program after becoming pregnant with the couple's first child, Mark (born May 1947), while Kurt also left the university without any degree (despite having completed his undergraduate education) when his master's thesis on the Ghost Dance religious movement was unanimously rejected by the department.

Shortly thereafter, General Electric (GE) hired Vonnegut as a technical writer, then publicist, for the company's Schenectady, New York, research laboratory. Although his work required a college degree, Vonnegut was hired after claiming to hold a master's degree in anthropology from the University of Chicago. His brother Bernard had worked at GE since 1945, contributing significantly to an iodine-based cloud seeding project.

In 1949, Kurt and Jane had a daughter named Edith. Still working for GE, Vonnegut had his first piece, titled "Report on the Barnhouse Effect", published in the February 11, 1950, issue of Collier's, for which he received $750. Vonnegut wrote another story, after being coached by the fiction editor at Collier's, Knox Burger, and again sold it to the magazine, this time for $950. While Burger supported Vonnegut's writing, he was shocked when Vonnegut quit GE as of January 1, 1951, later stating: "I never said he should give up his job and devote himself to fiction.  I don't trust the freelancer's life, it's tough." Nevertheless, in early 1951 Vonnegut moved with his family to Cape Cod, Massachusetts, to write full time, leaving GE behind.

First novel 
In 1952, Vonnegut's first novel, Player Piano, was published by Scribner's. The novel has a post-Third World War setting, in which factory workers have been replaced by machines. Player Piano draws upon Vonnegut's experience as an employee at GE. He satirizes the drive to climb the corporate ladder, one that in Player Piano is rapidly disappearing as automation increases, putting even executives out of work. His central character, Paul Proteus, has an ambitious wife, a backstabbing assistant, and a feeling of empathy for the poor. Sent by his boss, Kroner, as a double agent among the poor (who have all the material goods they want, but little sense of purpose), he leads them in a machine-smashing, museum-burning revolution. Player Piano expresses Vonnegut's opposition to McCarthyism, something made clear when the Ghost Shirts, the revolutionary organization Paul penetrates and eventually leads, is referred to by one character as "fellow travelers".

In Player Piano, Vonnegut originates many of the techniques he would use in his later works. The comic, heavy-drinking Shah of Bratpuhr, an outsider to this dystopian corporate United States, is able to ask many questions that an insider would not think to ask, or would cause offense by doing so. For example, when taken to see the artificially intelligent supercomputer EPICAC, the Shah asks it "what are people for?" and receives no answer. Speaking for Vonnegut, he dismisses it as a "false god". This type of alien visitor would recur throughout Vonnegut's literature.

The New York Times writer and critic Granville Hicks gave Player Piano a positive review, favorably comparing it to Aldous Huxley's Brave New World. Hicks called Vonnegut a "sharp-eyed satirist". None of the reviewers considered the novel particularly important. Several editions were printed—one by Bantam with the title Utopia 14, and another by the Doubleday Science Fiction Book Club—whereby Vonnegut gained the repute of a science fiction writer, a genre held in disdain by writers at that time. He defended the genre and deplored a perceived sentiment that "no one can simultaneously be a respectable writer and understand how a refrigerator works".

Struggling writer 

After Player Piano, Vonnegut continued to sell short stories to various magazines. Contracted to produce a second novel (which eventually became Cat's Cradle), he struggled to complete it, and the work languished for years. In 1954, the couple had a third child, Nanette. With a growing family and no financially successful novels yet, Vonnegut's short stories helped to sustain the family, though he frequently needed to find additional sources of income as well. In 1957, he and a partner opened a Saab automobile dealership on Cape Cod, but it went bankrupt by the end of the year.

In 1958, his sister, Alice, died of cancer two days after her husband, James Carmalt Adams, was killed in a train accident. The Vonneguts took in three of the Adams' young sons—James, Steven, and Kurt, aged 14, 11, and 9, respectively. A fourth Adams son, Peter (2), also stayed with the Vonneguts for about a year before being given to the care of a paternal relative in Georgia.

Grappling with family challenges, Vonnegut continued to write, publishing novels vastly dissimilar in terms of plot. The Sirens of Titan (1959) features a Martian invasion of Earth, as experienced by a bored billionaire Malachi Constant. He meets Winston Rumfoord, an aristocratic space traveler, who is virtually omniscient but stuck in a time warp that allows him to appear on Earth every 59 days. The billionaire learns that his actions and the events of all of history are determined by a race of robotic aliens from the planet Tralfamadore, who need a replacement part that can only be produced by an advanced civilization in order to repair their spaceship and return home—human history has been manipulated to produce it. Some human structures, such as the Kremlin, are coded signals from the aliens to their ship as to how long it may expect to wait for the repair to take place. Reviewers were uncertain what to think of the book, with one comparing it to Offenbach's opera The Tales of Hoffmann.

Rumfoord, who is based on Franklin D. Roosevelt, also physically resembles the former president. Rumfoord is described this way: he "put a cigarette in a long, bone cigarette holder, lighted it. He thrust out his jaw. The cigarette holder pointed straight up." William Rodney Allen, in his guide to Vonnegut's works, stated that Rumfoord foreshadowed the fictional political figures who would play major roles in God Bless You, Mr. Rosewater and Jailbird.

Mother Night, published in 1961, received little attention at the time of its publication. Howard W. Campbell Jr., Vonnegut's protagonist, is an American who is raised in Germany from age 11 and joins the Nazi party during the war as a double agent for the US Office of Strategic Services, rising to the regime's highest ranks as a radio propagandist. After the war, the spy agency refuses to clear his name, and he is eventually imprisoned by the Israelis in the same cell block as Adolf Eichmann and later commits suicide. Vonnegut wrote in a foreword to a later edition: "we are what we pretend to be, so we must be careful about what we pretend to be". Literary critic Lawrence Berkove considered the novel, like Mark Twain's Adventures of Huckleberry Finn, to illustrate the tendency for "impersonators to get carried away by their impersonations, to become what they impersonate and therefore to live in a world of illusion".

Also published in 1961 was Vonnegut's short story "Harrison Bergeron", set in a dystopic future where all are equal, even if that means disfiguring beautiful people and forcing the strong or intelligent to wear devices that negate their advantages. Fourteen-year-old Harrison is a genius and athlete forced to wear record-level "handicaps" and imprisoned for attempting to overthrow the government. He escapes to a television studio, tears away his handicaps, and frees a ballerina from her lead weights. As they dance, they are killed by the Handicapper General, Diana Moon Glampers. Vonnegut, in a later letter, suggested that "Harrison Bergeron" might have sprung from his envy and self-pity as a high-school misfit. In his 1976 biography of Vonnegut, Stanley Schatt suggested that the short story shows "in any leveling process, what really is lost, according to Vonnegut, is beauty, grace, and wisdom". Darryl Hattenhauer, in his 1998 journal article on "Harrison Bergeron", theorized that the story was a satire on American Cold War understandings of communism and socialism.

With Cat's Cradle (1963), Allen wrote, "Vonnegut hit full stride for the first time". The narrator, John, intends to write of Dr. Felix Hoenikker, one of the fictional fathers of the atomic bomb, seeking to cover the scientist's human side. Hoenikker, in addition to the bomb, has developed another threat to mankind, "ice-nine", solid water stable at room temperature, but more dense than liquid water. If a particle of ice-nine is dropped in water and sinks, all of the surrounding water eventually becomes ice-nine. Much of the second half of the book is spent on the fictional Caribbean island of San Lorenzo, where John explores a religion called Bokononism, whose holy books (excerpts from which are quoted) give the novel the moral core science does not supply. After the oceans are converted to ice-nine, wiping out most of humankind, John wanders the frozen surface, seeking to save himself and to make sure that his story survives.

Vonnegut based the title character of God Bless You, Mr. Rosewater (1964), on an accountant he knew on Cape Cod, who specialized in clients in trouble and often had to comfort them. Eliot Rosewater, the wealthy son of a Republican senator, seeks to atone for his wartime killing of noncombatant firefighters by serving in a volunteer fire department and by giving away money to those in trouble or need. Stress from a battle for control of his charitable foundation pushes him over the edge, and he is placed in a mental hospital. He recovers and ends the financial battle by declaring the children of his county to be his heirs. Allen deemed God Bless You, Mr. Rosewater more "a cry from the heart than a novel under its author's full intellectual control", that reflected family and emotional stresses Vonnegut was going through at the time.

In the mid-1960s, Vonnegut contemplated abandoning his writing career. In 1999, he wrote in The New York Times: "I had gone broke, was out of print and had a lot of kids..." But then, on the recommendation of an admirer, he received a surprise offer of a teaching job at the Iowa Writers' Workshop, employment that he likened to the rescue of a drowning man.

Slaughterhouse-Five 

After spending almost two years at the writer's workshop at the University of Iowa, teaching one course each term, Vonnegut was awarded a Guggenheim Fellowship for research in Germany. By the time he won it, in March 1967, he was becoming a well-known writer. He used the funds to travel in Eastern Europe, including to Dresden, where he found many prominent buildings still in ruins. At the time of the bombing, Vonnegut had not appreciated the sheer scale of destruction in Dresden; his enlightenment came only slowly as information dribbled out, and based on early figures, he came to believe that 135,000 had died there.

Vonnegut had been writing about his war experiences at Dresden ever since he returned from the war, but had never been able to write anything acceptable to himself or his publishers—chapter 1 of Slaughterhouse-Five tells of his difficulties. Released in 1969, the novel rocketed Vonnegut to fame. It tells of the life of Billy Pilgrim, who like Vonnegut was born in 1922 and survives the bombing of Dresden. The story is told in a non-linear fashion, with many of the story's climaxes—Billy's death in 1976, his kidnapping by aliens from the planet Tralfamadore nine years earlier, and the execution of Billy's friend Edgar Derby in the ashes of Dresden for stealing a teapot—disclosed in the story's first pages. In 1970, he was also a correspondent in Biafra during the Nigerian Civil War.

Slaughterhouse-Five received generally positive reviews, with Michael Crichton writing in The New Republic:
 "he writes about the most excruciatingly painful things. His novels have attacked our deepest fears of automation and the bomb, our deepest political guilts, our fiercest hatreds and loves. No one else writes books on these subjects; they are inaccessible to normal novelists."

The book went immediately to the top of The New York Times Best Seller list. Vonnegut's earlier works had appealed strongly to many college students, and the antiwar message of Slaughterhouse-Five resonated with a generation marked by the Vietnam War. He later stated that the loss of confidence in government that Vietnam caused finally allowed an honest conversation regarding events like Dresden.

Later career and life 
After Slaughterhouse-Five was published, Vonnegut embraced the fame and financial security that attended its release. He was hailed as a hero of the burgeoning anti-war movement in the United States, was invited to speak at numerous rallies, and gave college commencement addresses around the country. In addition to briefly teaching at Harvard University as a lecturer in creative writing in 1970, Vonnegut taught at the City College of New York as a distinguished professor during the 1973–1974 academic year. He was later elected vice president of the National Institute of Arts and Letters and given honorary degrees by, among others, Indiana University and Bennington College. Vonnegut also wrote a play called Happy Birthday, Wanda June, which opened on October 7, 1970, at New York's Theatre de Lys. Receiving mixed reviews, it closed on March 14, 1971. In 1972, Universal Pictures adapted Slaughterhouse-Five into a film, which the author said was "flawless".

Meanwhile, Vonnegut's personal life was disintegrating. His wife Jane had embraced Christianity, which was contrary to Vonnegut's atheistic beliefs, and with five of their six children having left home, Vonnegut said that the two were forced to find "other sorts of seemingly important work to do". The couple battled over their differing beliefs until Vonnegut moved from their Cape Cod home to New York in 1971. Vonnegut called the disagreements "painful" and said that the resulting split was a "terrible, unavoidable accident that we were ill-equipped to understand". The couple divorced but remained friends until Jane's death in late 1986. Beyond his marriage, he was deeply affected when his son Mark suffered a mental breakdown in 1972, which exacerbated Vonnegut's chronic depression and led him to take Ritalin. When he stopped taking the drug in the mid-1970s, he began to see a psychologist weekly.

Vonnegut's difficulties materialized in numerous ways; most distinctly though, was the painfully slow progress he was making on his next novel, the darkly comical Breakfast of Champions. In 1971, Vonnegut stopped writing the novel altogether. When it was finally released in 1973, it was panned critically. In Thomas S. Hischak's book American Literature on Stage and Screen, Breakfast of Champions was called "funny and outlandish", but reviewers noted that it "lacks substance and seems to be an exercise in literary playfulness". Vonnegut's 1976 novel Slapstick, which meditates on the relationship between him and his sister (Alice), met a similar fate. In The New York Times's review of Slapstick, Christopher Lehmann-Haupt said that Vonnegut "seems to be putting less effort into [storytelling] than ever before" and that "it still seems as if he has given up storytelling after all". At times, Vonnegut was disgruntled by the personal nature of his detractors' complaints.

In 1979, Vonnegut married Jill Krementz, a photographer whom he met while she was working on a series about writers in the early 1970s. With Jill, he adopted a daughter, Lily, when the baby was three days old. In subsequent years, his popularity resurged as he published several satirical books, including Jailbird (1979), Deadeye Dick (1982), Galápagos (1985), Bluebeard (1987), and Hocus Pocus (1990). Although he remained a prolific writer in the 1980s, Vonnegut struggled with depression and attempted suicide in 1984. Two years later, Vonnegut was seen by a younger generation when he played himself in Rodney Dangerfield's film Back to School. The last of Vonnegut's fourteen novels, Timequake (1997), was, as University of Detroit history professor and Vonnegut biographer Gregory Sumner said, "a reflection of an aging man facing mortality and testimony to an embattled faith in the resilience of human awareness and agency". Vonnegut's final book, a collection of essays entitled A Man Without a Country (2005), became a bestseller.

Death and legacy 

In a 2006 Rolling Stone interview, Vonnegut sardonically stated that he would sue the Brown & Williamson tobacco company, the maker of the Pall Mall-branded cigarettes he had been smoking since he was around 12 or 14 years old, for false advertising: "And do you know why? Because I'm 83 years old. The lying bastards! On the package Brown & Williamson promised to kill me."

Vonnegut died in the Manhattan borough of New York City on the night of April 11, 2007, as a result of brain injuries incurred several weeks prior, from a fall at his brownstone home. His death was reported by his wife Jill. He was 84 years old. At the time of his death, he had written fourteen novels, three short-story collections, five plays, and five nonfiction books. A book composed of his unpublished pieces, Armageddon in Retrospect, was compiled and posthumously published by his son Mark in 2008.

When asked about the impact Vonnegut had on his work, author Josip Novakovich stated that he has "much to learn from Vonnegut—how to compress things and yet not compromise them, how to digress into history, quote from various historical accounts, and not stifle the narrative. The ease with which he writes is sheerly masterly, Mozartian." Los Angeles Times columnist Gregory Rodriguez said that the author will "rightly be remembered as a darkly humorous social critic and the premier novelist of the counterculture", and Dinitia Smith of The New York Times dubbed Vonnegut the "counterculture's novelist".

Vonnegut has inspired numerous posthumous tributes and works. In 2008, the Kurt Vonnegut Society was established, and in November 2010, the Kurt Vonnegut Museum and Library was opened in Vonnegut's hometown of Indianapolis. The Library of America published a compendium of Vonnegut's compositions between 1963 and 1973 the following April, and another compendium of his earlier works in 2012. Late 2011 saw the release of two Vonnegut biographies: Gregory Sumner's Unstuck in Time and Charles J. Shields's And So It Goes. Shields's biography of Vonnegut created some controversy. According to The Guardian, the book portrays Vonnegut as distant, cruel and nasty. "Cruel, nasty and scary are the adjectives commonly used to describe him by the friends, colleagues, and relatives Shields quotes", said The Daily Beasts Wendy Smith. "Towards the end he was very feeble, very depressed and almost morose", said Jerome Klinkowitz of the University of Northern Iowa, who has examined Vonnegut in depth.

Vonnegut's works have evoked ire on several occasions. His most prominent novel, Slaughterhouse-Five, has been objected to or removed at various institutions in at least 18 instances. In the case of Island Trees School District v. Pico, the United States Supreme Court ruled that a school district's ban on Slaughterhouse-Five—which the board had called "anti-American, anti-Christian, anti-Semitic, and just plain filthy"—and eight other novels was unconstitutional. When a school board in Republic, Missouri, decided to withdraw Vonnegut's novel from its libraries, the Kurt Vonnegut Memorial Library offered a free copy to all the students of the district.

Tally, writing in 2013, suggests that Vonnegut has only recently become the subject of serious study rather than fan adulation, and much is yet to be written about him. "The time for scholars to say 'Here's why Vonnegut is worth reading' has definitively ended, thank goodness. We know he's worth reading. Now tell us things we don't know." Todd F. Davis notes that Vonnegut's work is kept alive by his loyal readers, who have "significant influence as they continue to purchase Vonnegut's work, passing it on to subsequent generations and keeping his entire canon in print—an impressive list of more than twenty books that [Dell Publishing] has continued to refurbish and hawk with new cover designs." Donald E. Morse notes that Vonnegut "is now firmly, if somewhat controversially, ensconced in the American and world literary canon as well as in high school, college and graduate curricula". Tally writes of Vonnegut's work:

The Science Fiction and Fantasy Hall of Fame inducted Vonnegut posthumously in 2015. The asteroid 25399 Vonnegut is named in his honor.  A crater on the planet Mercury has also been named in his honor. In 2021, the Kurt Vonnegut Museum and Library in Indianapolis was designated a Literary Landmark by the Literary Landmarks Association. In 1986, the University of Evansville library located in Evansville, Indiana was named after Vonnegut, where he spoke during the dedication ceremony.

Views

War 
In the introduction to Slaughterhouse-Five, Vonnegut recounts meeting the film producer Harrison Starr at a party, who asked him whether his forthcoming book was an anti-war novel—"I guess", replied Vonnegut. Starr responded: "Why don't you write an anti-glacier novel?" This underlined Vonnegut's belief that wars were, unfortunately, inevitable, but that it was important to ensure the wars one fought were just wars.

In 2011, NPR wrote: "Kurt Vonnegut's blend of anti-war sentiment and satire made him one of the most popular writers of the 1960s." Vonnegut stated in a 1987 interview: "my own feeling is that civilization ended in World War I, and we're still trying to recover from that", and that he wanted to write war-focused works without glamorizing war itself. Vonnegut had not intended to publish again, but his anger against the George W. Bush administration led him to write A Man Without a Country.

Slaughterhouse-Five is the Vonnegut novel best known for its antiwar themes, but the author expressed his beliefs in ways beyond the depiction of the destruction of Dresden. One character, Mary O'Hare, opines that "wars were partly encouraged by books and movies", starring "Frank Sinatra or John Wayne or some of those other glamorous, war-loving, dirty old men". Vonnegut made a number of comparisons between Dresden and the bombing of Hiroshima in Slaughterhouse-Five and wrote in Palm Sunday (1991): "I learned how vile that religion of mine could be when the atomic bomb was dropped on Hiroshima".

Nuclear war, or at least deployed nuclear arms, is mentioned in almost all of Vonnegut's novels. In Player Piano, the computer EPICAC is given control of the nuclear arsenal and is charged with deciding whether to use high-explosive or nuclear arms. In Cat's Cradle, John's original purpose in setting pen to paper was to write an account of what prominent Americans had been doing as Hiroshima was bombed.

Religion 

Vonnegut was an atheist, a humanist and a freethinker, serving as the honorary president of the American Humanist Association. In an interview for Playboy, he stated that his forebears who came to the United States did not believe in God, and he learned his atheism from his parents. He did not, however, disdain those who seek the comfort of religion, hailing church associations as a type of extended family. He occasionally attended a Unitarian church, but with little consistency. In his autobiographical work Palm Sunday, Vonnegut says that he is a "Christ-worshipping agnostic"; in a speech to the Unitarian Universalist Association, he called himself a "Christ-loving atheist". However, he was keen to stress that he was not a Christian.

Vonnegut was an admirer of Jesus' Sermon on the Mount, particularly the Beatitudes, and incorporated it into his own doctrines. He also referred to it in many of his works. In his 1991 book Fates Worse than Death, Vonnegut suggests that during the Reagan administration, "anything that sounded like the Sermon on the Mount was socialistic or communistic, and therefore anti-American". In Palm Sunday, he wrote that "the Sermon on the Mount suggests a mercifulness that can never waver or fade". However, Vonnegut had a deep dislike for certain aspects of Christianity, often reminding his readers of the bloody history of the Crusades and other religion-inspired violence. He despised the televangelists of the late 20th century, feeling that their thinking was narrow-minded.

Religion features frequently in Vonnegut's work, both in his novels and elsewhere. He laced a number of his speeches with religion-focused rhetoric and was prone to using such expressions as "God forbid" and "thank God". He once wrote his own version of the Requiem Mass, which he then had translated into Latin and set to music. In God Bless You, Dr. Kevorkian, Vonnegut goes to heaven after he is euthanized by Dr. Jack Kevorkian. Once in heaven, he interviews 21 deceased celebrities, including Isaac Asimov, William Shakespeare, and Kilgore Trout—the last a fictional character from several of his novels. Vonnegut's works are filled with characters founding new faiths, and religion often serves as a major plot device, for example, in Player Piano, The Sirens of Titan and Cat's Cradle. In The Sirens of Titan, Rumfoord proclaims The Church of God the Utterly Indifferent. Slaughterhouse-Five sees Billy Pilgrim, lacking religion himself, nevertheless become a chaplain's assistant in the military and display a large crucifix on his bedroom wall. In Cat's Cradle, Vonnegut invented the religion of Bokononism.

Politics 
Vonnegut's thoughts on politics were shaped in large part by Robert Redfield, an anthropologist at the University of Chicago, co-founder of the Committee on Social Thought, and one of Vonnegut's professors during his time at the university. In a commencement address, Vonnegut remarked that "Dr. Redfield's theory of the Folk Society ... has been the starting point for my politics, such as they are". Vonnegut did not particularly sympathize with liberalism or conservatism and mused on the specious simplicity of American politics, saying facetiously: "If you want to take my guns away from me, and you're all for murdering fetuses, and love it when homosexuals marry each other ... you're a liberal. If you are against those perversions and for the rich, you're a conservative. What could be simpler?" Regarding political parties, Vonnegut said: "The two real political parties in America are the Winners and the Losers. The people don't acknowledge this. They claim membership in two imaginary parties, the Republicans and the Democrats, instead."

Vonnegut disregarded more mainstream American political ideologies in favor of socialism, which he thought could provide a valuable substitute for what he saw as social Darwinism and a spirit of "survival of the fittest" in American society, believing that "socialism would be a good for the common man". Vonnegut would often return to a quote by socialist and five-time presidential candidate Eugene V. Debs: "As long as there is a lower class, I am in it. As long as there is a criminal element, I'm of it. As long as there is a soul in prison, I am not free." Vonnegut expressed disappointment that communism and socialism seemed to be unsavory topics to the average American and believed that they offered beneficial substitutes to contemporary social and economic systems.

Writing

Influences 
Vonnegut's writing was inspired by an eclectic mix of sources. When he was younger, Vonnegut stated that he read works of pulp fiction, science fiction, fantasy, and action-adventure. He also read the classics, such as the plays of Aristophanes—like Vonnegut's works, humorous critiques of contemporary society. Vonnegut's life and work also share similarities with that of Adventures of Huckleberry Finn writer Mark Twain. Both shared pessimistic outlooks on humanity and a skeptical take on religion and, as Vonnegut put it, were both "associated with the enemy in a major war", as Twain briefly enlisted in the South's cause during the American Civil War, and Vonnegut's German name and ancestry connected him with the United States' enemy in both world wars. He also cited Ambrose Bierce as an influence, calling "An Occurrence at Owl Creek Bridge" the greatest American short story and deeming any who disagreed or had not read the story "twerps".

Vonnegut called George Orwell his favorite writer and admitted that he tried to emulate Orwell. "I like his concern for the poor, I like his socialism, I like his simplicity", Vonnegut said. Vonnegut also said that Orwell's Nineteen Eighty-Four and Brave New World by Aldous Huxley heavily influenced his debut novel, Player Piano, in 1952. Vonnegut commented that Robert Louis Stevenson's stories were emblems of thoughtfully put together works that he tried to mimic in his own compositions. Vonnegut also hailed playwright and socialist George Bernard Shaw as "a hero of [his]" and an "enormous influence". Within his own family, Vonnegut stated that his mother, Edith, had the greatest influence on him. "[My] mother thought she might make a new fortune by writing for the slick magazines. She took short-story courses at night. She studied writers the way gamblers study horses."

Early on in his career, Vonnegut decided to model his style after Henry David Thoreau, who wrote as if from the perspective of a child, allowing Thoreau's works to be more widely comprehensible. Using a youthful narrative voice allowed Vonnegut to deliver concepts in a modest and straightforward way. Other influences on Vonnegut include The War of the Worlds author H. G. Wells and satirist Jonathan Swift. Vonnegut credited American journalist and critic H. L. Mencken for inspiring him to become a journalist.

Style and technique 

The book Pity the Reader: On Writing with Style by Kurt Vonnegut and his longtime friend and former student Suzanne McConnell, published posthumously by Rosetta Books and Seven Stories Press in 2019, delves into the style, humor, and methodologism employed by Vonnegut, including his belief that one should "Write like a human being. Write like a writer." 

In his book Popular Contemporary Writers, Michael D. Sharp describes Vonnegut's linguistic style as straightforward; his sentences concise, his language simple, his paragraphs brief, and his ordinary tone conversational. Vonnegut uses this style to convey normally complex subject matter in a way that is intelligible to a large audience. He credited his time as a journalist for his ability, pointing to his work with the Chicago City News Bureau, which required him to convey stories in telephone conversations. Vonnegut's compositions are also laced with distinct references to his own life, notably in Slaughterhouse-Five and Slapstick.

Vonnegut believed that ideas, and the convincing communication of those ideas to the reader, were vital to literary art. He did not always sugarcoat his points: much of Player Piano leads up to the moment when Paul, on trial and hooked up to a lie detector, is asked to tell a falsehood, and states: "every new piece of scientific knowledge is a good thing for humanity". Robert T. Tally Jr., in his volume on Vonnegut's novels, wrote: "rather than tearing down and destroying the icons of twentieth-century, middle-class American life, Vonnegut gently reveals their basic flimsiness". Vonnegut did not simply propose utopian solutions to the ills of American society, but showed how such schemes would not allow ordinary people to live lives free from want and anxiety. The large artificial families that the US population is formed into in Slapstick soon serve as an excuse for tribalism, with people giving no help to those not part of their group, and with the extended family's place in the social hierarchy becoming vital.

In the introduction to their essay "Kurt Vonnegut and Humor", Tally and Peter C. Kunze suggest that Vonnegut was not a "black humorist", but a "frustrated idealist" who used "comic parables" to teach the reader absurd, bitter or hopeless truths, with his grim witticisms serving to make the reader laugh rather than cry. "Vonnegut makes sense through humor, which is, in the author's view, as valid a means of mapping this crazy world as any other strategies." Vonnegut resented being called a black humorist, feeling that, as with many literary labels, it allows readers to disregard aspects of a writer's work that do not fit the label's stereotype.

Vonnegut's works have, at various times, been labeled science fiction, satire and postmodern. He also resisted such labels, but his works do contain common tropes that are often associated with those genres. In several of his books, Vonnegut imagines alien societies and civilizations, as is common in works of science fiction. Vonnegut does this to emphasize or exaggerate absurdities and idiosyncrasies in our own world. Furthermore, Vonnegut often humorizes the problems that plague societies, as is done in satirical works. However, literary theorist Robert Scholes noted in Fabulation and Metafiction that Vonnegut "reject[s] the traditional satirist's faith in the efficacy of satire as a reforming instrument. [He has] a more subtle faith in the humanizing value of laughter." Examples of postmodernism may also be found in Vonnegut's works.

Postmodernism often entails a response to the theory that the truths of the world will be discovered through science. Postmodernists contend that truth is subjective, rather than objective, as it is biased towards each individual's beliefs and outlook on the world. They often use unreliable, first-person narration, and narrative fragmentation. One critic has argued that Vonnegut's most famous novel, Slaughterhouse-Five, features a metafictional, Janus-headed outlook, as it seeks to represent actual historical events while problematizing the very notion of doing exactly that. This is encapsulated in the opening lines of the novel: "All this happened, more or less. The war parts, anyway, are pretty much true." This bombastic opening—"All this happened"—"reads like a declaration of complete mimesis", which is radically called into question in the rest of the quote and "[t]his creates an integrated perspective that seeks out extratextual themes [like war and trauma] while thematizing the novel's textuality and inherent constructedness at one and the same time". While Vonnegut does use elements as fragmentation and metafictional elements, in some of his works, he more distinctly focuses on the peril posed by individuals who find subjective truths, mistake them for objective truths, then proceed to impose these truths on others.

Themes 
Vonnegut was a vocal critic of American society, and this was reflected in his writings. Several key social themes recur in Vonnegut's works, such as wealth, the lack of it, and its unequal distribution among a society. In The Sirens of Titan, the novel's protagonist, Malachi Constant, is exiled to Saturn's moon Titan as a result of his vast wealth, which has made him arrogant and wayward. In God Bless You, Mr. Rosewater, readers may find it difficult to determine whether the rich or the poor are in worse circumstances, as the lives of both groups' members are ruled by their wealth or their poverty. Further, in Hocus Pocus, the protagonist is named Eugene Debs Hartke, a homage to the famed socialist Eugene V. Debs and Vonnegut's socialist views.

In Kurt Vonnegut: A Critical Companion, Thomas F. Marvin states: "Vonnegut points out that, left unchecked, capitalism will erode the democratic foundations of the United States." Marvin suggests that Vonnegut's works demonstrate what happens when a "hereditary aristocracy" develops, where wealth is inherited along familial lines: the ability of poor Americans to overcome their situations is greatly or completely diminished. Vonnegut also often laments social Darwinism and a "survival of the fittest" view of society. He points out that social Darwinism leads to a society that condemns its poor for their own misfortune and fails to help them out of their poverty because "they deserve their fate".

Vonnegut also confronts the idea of free will in a number of his pieces. In Slaughterhouse-Five and Timequake the characters have no choice in what they do; in Breakfast of Champions, characters are very obviously stripped of their free will and even receive it as a gift; and in Cat's Cradle, Bokononism views free will as heretical.

The majority of Vonnegut's characters are estranged from their actual families and seek to build replacement or extended families. For example, the engineers in Player Piano called their manager's spouse "Mom". In Cat's Cradle, Vonnegut devises two separate methods for loneliness to be combated: A "karass", which is a group of individuals appointed by God to do his will, and a "granfalloon", defined by Marvin as a "meaningless association of people, such as a fraternal group or a nation". Similarly, in Slapstick, the US government codifies that all Americans are a part of large extended families.

Fear of the loss of one's purpose in life is a theme in Vonnegut's works. The Great Depression forced Vonnegut to witness the devastation many people felt when they lost their jobs, and while at General Electric, Vonnegut witnessed machines being built to take the place of human labor. He confronts these things in his works through references to the growing use of automation and its effects on human society. This is most starkly represented in his first novel, Player Piano, where many Americans are left purposeless and unable to find work, as machines replace human workers. Loss of purpose is also depicted in Galápagos, where a florist rages at her spouse for creating a robot able to do her job, and in Timequake, where an architect kills himself when replaced by computer software.

Suicide by fire is another common theme in Vonnegut's works; the author often returns to the theory that "many people are not fond of life". He uses this as an explanation for why humans have so severely damaged their environments and made devices such as nuclear weapons that can make their creators extinct. In Deadeye Dick, Vonnegut features the neutron bomb, which he claims is designed to kill people, but leave buildings and structures untouched. He also uses this theme to demonstrate the recklessness of those who put powerful, apocalypse-inducing devices at the disposal of politicians.

"What is the point of life?" is a question Vonnegut often pondered in his works. When one of Vonnegut's characters, Kilgore Trout, finds the question "What is the purpose of life?" written in a bathroom, his response is: "To be the eyes and ears and conscience of the Creator of the Universe, you fool." Marvin finds Trout's theory curious, given that Vonnegut was an atheist, and thus for him, there is no Creator to report back to, and comments that, "[as] Trout chronicles one meaningless life after another, readers are left to wonder how a compassionate creator could stand by and do nothing while such reports come in". In the epigraph to Bluebeard, Vonnegut quotes his son Mark and gives an answer to what he believes is the meaning of life: "We are here to help each other get through this thing, whatever it is."

Awards and nominations 
 1953 International Fantasy Award nomination: Player Piano
 1960 Writers Guild of America Award: "Auf Wiedersehen"
 1960 Hugo Award for Best Novel finalist: The Sirens of Titan
 1964 Hugo Award for Best Novel finalist: Cat's Cradle
 1970 Nebula Award nomination: Slaughterhouse-Five
 1970 Hugo Award for Best Novel finalist: Slaughterhouse-Five
 1971 Drama Desk Award for Outstanding New Play: Happy Birthday Wanda June
 1973 Seiun Award winner for foreign novel: The Sirens of Titan 
 1973 Hugo Award for Best Dramatic Presentation winner: Slaughterhouse-Five
 1986 John W. Campbell Award second place: Galapagos
 2009 Audie Award for Short Stories/Collections: Armageddon in Retrospect
 2015 Science Fiction and Fantasy Hall of Fame from the Science Fiction Museum
 2019 Prometheus Hall of Fame award for "Harrison Bergeron" from the Libertarian Futurist Society

Works 

Unless otherwise cited, items in this list are taken from Thomas F. Marvin's 2002 book Kurt Vonnegut: A Critical Companion, and the date in parentheses is the date the work was published:

Novels
 Player Piano (1952)
 The Sirens of Titan (1959)
 Mother Night (1962)
 Cat's Cradle (1963)
 God Bless You, Mr. Rosewater (1965)
 Slaughterhouse-Five (1969)
 Breakfast of Champions (1973)
 Slapstick (1976)
 Jailbird (1979)
 Deadeye Dick (1982)
 Galápagos (1985)
 Bluebeard (1987)
 Hocus Pocus (1990)
 Timequake (1997)

Short fiction collections
 Canary in a Cat House (1961)
 Welcome to the Monkey House (1968)
 Bagombo Snuff Box (1997)
 God Bless You, Dr. Kevorkian (1999)
 Armageddon in Retrospect (2008) – short stories and essays
 Look at the Birdie (2009)
 While Mortals Sleep (2011)
 We Are What We Pretend to Be (2012)
 Sucker's Portfolio (2013)
 Complete Stories (2017)

Plays
 The First Christmas Morning (1962)
 Fortitude (1968)
 Happy Birthday, Wanda June (1970)
 Between Time and Timbuktu (1972)
 Stones, Time and Elements (A Humanist Requiem) (1987)
 Make Up Your Mind (1993)
 L'Histoire du Soldat (1997)

Nonfiction
 Wampeters, Foma and Granfalloons (1974)
 Palm Sunday (1981)
 Nothing Is Lost Save Honor: Two Essays (1984)
 Fates Worse Than Death (1991)
 A Man Without a Country (2005)
 Kurt Vonnegut: The Cornell Sun Years 1941–1943 (2012)
 If This Isn't Nice, What Is?: Advice to the Young (2013)
 Vonnegut by the Dozen (2013)
 Kurt Vonnegut: Letters (2014)
 Pity the Reader: On Writing With Style (2019) with Suzanne McConnell
 Love, Kurt: The Vonnegut Love Letters, 1941–1945 (2020) Editor Edith Vonnegut

Interviews
 Conversations with Kurt Vonnegut (1988) with William Rodney Allen
 Like Shaking Hands with God: A Conversation About Writing (1999) with Lee Stringer
 Kurt Vonnegut: The Last Interview: And Other Conversations (2011)

Children's books
 Sun Moon Star (1980)

Art
 Kurt Vonnegut Drawings (2014)

See also
 List of peace activists

Explanatory notes

Citations

General sources

Further reading
 Craig, Cairns (1983), An Interview with Kurt Vonnegut, in Hearn, Sheila G. (ed.), Cencrastus No. 13, Summer 1983, pp. 29–32, .
 Oltean-Cîmpean, A. A. (2016). "Kurt Vonnegut's Humanism: An Author's Journey Towards Preaching for Peace". Studii De Ştiintă Şi Cultură, 12(2), 259–266.
 Párraga, J. J. (2013). "Kurt Vonnegut's Quest for Identity". Revista Futhark, 8185–8199.

External links

 
 Kurt Vonnegut papers at the Lilly Library, Indiana University Bloomington
 Vonnegut, Kurt at the Library of Congress
 Kurt Vonnegut Memorial Library
 
 
 
 
 
 
 Award Bibliography: Kurt Vonnegut, Jr. at ISFDB
 Kurt Vonnegut, Jr. at SFADB
 Great Lives – Kurt Vonnegut
 Remembering-author-kurt-vonnegut-who-would-have-turned-100-on-friday 11/11/2022 NPR

 
1922 births
2007 deaths
20th-century American dramatists and playwrights
20th-century American essayists
20th-century American male artists
20th-century American male writers
20th-century American memoirists
20th-century American non-fiction writers
20th-century American novelists
20th-century American philosophers
20th-century American poets
20th-century American screenwriters
20th-century American short story writers
20th-century letter writers
21st-century American essayists
21st-century American male artists
21st-century American male writers
21st-century American memoirists
21st-century American non-fiction writers
21st-century American novelists
21st-century American philosophers
21st-century American poets
21st-century American short story writers
Accidental deaths from falls
Accidental deaths in New York (state)
American agnostics
American alternate history writers
American anti-fascists
American anti–Iraq War activists
American anti–Vietnam War activists
American atheists
American autobiographers
American children's writers
American ethicists
American humorists
American humanists
American letter writers
American librettists
American literary critics
American male artists
American male dramatists and playwrights
American male essayists
American male non-fiction writers
American male novelists
American male poets
American male screenwriters
American male short story writers
American memoirists
American pacifists
American people of German descent
American political philosophers
American prisoners of war in World War II
American satirical novelists
American satirists
American science fiction writers
American secularists
American social commentators
American socialists
American speculative fiction critics
American speculative fiction writers
American tax resisters
American television hosts
American travel writers
American Unitarian Universalists
Carnegie Mellon University alumni
City College of New York faculty
Comedians from Indiana
Cornell University alumni
Critics of Christianity
Critics of neoconservatism
Critics of religions
Critics of the Catholic Church
Freethought writers
General Electric people
Harper's Magazine people
Harvard University faculty
Humor researchers
Iowa Writers' Workshop faculty
Irony theorists
Literacy and society theorists
Literary theorists
Mass media theorists
Members of the American Academy of Arts and Letters
Nonviolence advocates
Novelists from Indiana
People with post-traumatic stress disorder
Philosophers of art
Philosophers of culture
Philosophers of education
Philosophers of history
Philosophers of literature
Philosophers of love
Philosophers of science
Philosophers of social science
Philosophers of technology
Philosophers of time
Philosophers of war
American psychological fiction writers
Postmodern writers
Science fiction critics
Secular humanists
Shortridge High School alumni
Social philosophers
Surrealist writers
Theorists on Western civilization
Trope theorists
United States Army personnel of World War II
United States Army soldiers
University of Chicago alumni
University of Iowa faculty
University of Tennessee alumni
Vonnegut family
War correspondents of the Nigerian Civil War
Weird fiction writers
World War II prisoners of war held by Germany
Writers about activism and social change
Writers about globalization
Writers about religion and science
Writers from Indianapolis
Writers from Manhattan
Writers of books about writing fiction
Writers of historical fiction set in the modern age
Writers who illustrated their own writing